Harold James Kirby (April 28, 1895 – October 20, 1956) was a lawyer, real estate agent and political figure in Ontario. He represented Eglinton in the Legislative Assembly of Ontario from 1934 to 1943 as a Liberal member.

Background
He was born in Maple, the son of James Henry Kirby, and educated in North Toronto and at Osgoode Hall. Kirby served overseas with the Canadian Expeditionary Force during World War I. He died following a heart attack in 1956.

Politics
He was Minister of Health from 1937 to 1943 and Minister of Public Welfare from 1942 to 1943.

Cabinet positions

References

External links
 

1895 births
1956 deaths
Members of the Executive Council of Ontario
Ontario Liberal Party MPPs